Judgemeadow Community College is a mixed secondary school located in the Evington area of Leicester in the English county of Leicestershire.

History
The school was established in 1973, and moved into a new building on the same site in June 2009 as part of the Building Schools for the Future programme. Previously a community school administered by Leicester City Council, in June 2018 Judgemeadow Community College converted to academy status and is now sponsored by the Lionheart Educational Trust (formerly Lionheart Academies Trust)

The school has been rated as ‘good’ by Ofsted in 2022

School profile
With a student population of 1400, Judgemeadow Community College has a larger number of pupils than average in the UK. With only 45.3% girls against 54.7% boys, the school has slightly more males than females. Schools maintain a record of attendance through a series of registration sessions at the beginning and end of the school day. They have a 94.5% rate of pupils regularly attending, which is around average. With 73 members of staff, Judgemeadow Community College is well-staffed, with an ample number of teachers. Having a higher-than-average 16:1 teacher/pupil ratio, this school has many pupils in this local authority.
The government considers 5 good GCSE grades at grade A-C as a successful achievement for a pupil at KS4. An average GCSE (KS4) score of 39.7 is a little above the normal result for the school. The average full-time teacher's salary for the school is £40342, which is higher than the nationwide average. Only 57.2% of pupils speak English as a 1st language in Judgemeadow Community College, a proportion much lower than the country's average figure.

As a state comprehensive school within the East Midlands, Judgemeadow academically performs above average compared to national statistics, 
Progress 8 score
Judgemeadow: +0.09
Leicester City average: -0.01
National average: 0
 
Attainment 8 score
Judgemeadow: 49.2
Leicester City average: 42.4
National average: 44.2
 
Students achieving a strong pass (grade 5) in English and Maths
Judgemeadow: 45%
Leicester City average: 34.7%
National average: 39.1%
 
Students achieving the EBacc
Judgemeadow: 27%
Leicester City average: 14.8%
National average: 19.5%
 
Students staying in education or employment
Judgemeadow: 94%
Leicester City average: 90%
National average: 94%

Academics 
Judgemeadow Community College offers GCSEs, BTECs and ASDAN qualifications as programmes of study for pupils.

Notable former pupils
Bali Rai, Novelist
Andy May, Sports Presenter

References

External links
Judgemeadow Community College official website

Secondary schools in Leicester
Educational institutions established in 1973
1973 establishments in England
Academies in Leicester